North Macedonia competed at the 2022 World Aquatics Championships in Budapest, Hungary from 18 June to 3 July.

Open water swimming

Swimmers from North Macedonia have achieved qualifying standards in the following events.

Swimming

Swimmers from North Macedonia have achieved qualifying standards in the following events.

References

Nations at the 2022 World Aquatics Championships
World Aquatics Championships
2022